Laurie Jarman (born 7 August 1935) is  a former Australian rules footballer who played with Fitzroy in the Victorian Football League (VFL).

Notes

External links 

Living people
1935 births
Australian rules footballers from Victoria (Australia)
Fitzroy Football Club players